Paraborsonia lindae is a species of sea snail, a marine gastropod mollusk in the family Borsoniidae.

Description
Original description: "Shell short, stocky, biconic in shape; shoulder rounded, demarcated by 2 large, beaded cords; body whorl ornamented with 20-25 fine, beaded spiral cords; subsutural area indented, slightly canaliculate; columella with 3 large plications; interior of aperture with numerous ribs; protoconch large, flattened on top; anal notch corresponding to canaliculate subsutural area, deep and narrow; shell color pale yellow with darker yellow crescent-shaped flammules along the shoulder; anterior tip of columella dark yellow; interior of aperture white."

The length of the shell attains 16 mm.

Distribution
Locus typicus: "Golfo de Triste, off Puerto Cabello, Venezuela."

This marine species occurs in the Caribbean Sea off Venezuela and Guadeloupe

References

 Petuch, Edward J. New Caribbean Molluscan Faunas. (1987).
 Petuch, Edward J. Biogeography and biodiversity of Western Atlantic mollusks. CRC Press, 2013.

External links
 

lindae
Gastropods described in 1987
Invertebrates of Venezuela